Annie Elizabeth Kelly  (née Abbott; 12 April 1877 – 4 October 1946) was a New Zealand artist. She was the first New Zealand woman to receive the CBE for services to art.

Biography
Kelly was born in Christchurch, New Zealand on 12 April 1877. She studied at the Canterbury College School of Art under Edith Munnings, Alfred Walsh and George Elliot Clark, the headmaster of the school.

In 1908 Kelly married fellow painter Cecil Fletcher Kelly and the two painted landscapes together. As an official New Zealand war artist, Kelly painted a posthumous portrait of Sergeant Henry James Nicholas.

In the 1920s the couple traveled to Britain and Europe, while Kelly's reputation as a portraitist grew. 

In 1931 Kelly exhibited a portrait of Edith Bryan at the Royal Academy of Arts in London and she exhibited at that academy several times thereafter. In 1932 she exhibited the same portrait at the Paris Salon of the Société des Artistes Français.

In the 1938 King's Birthday Honours, Kelly was appointed a Commander of the Order of the British Empire. In 1940 the Scottish National Portrait Gallery purchased her portrait of James Park for its collection. 

Kelly died on 4 October 1946 in Christchurch.

Legacy
In 1996, on the 50th anniversary of her death, Robert McDougall Art Gallery in Christchurch staged an exhibition of her work.

References

Further reading
Kelly, Annie Elizabeth CBE née Abbott 1877–1946 in Nineteenth Century New Zealand Artists: A Guide & Handbook (1980) Una Platts

1877 births
1946 deaths
New Zealand artists
People from Christchurch
Ilam School of Fine Arts alumni
New Zealand Commanders of the Order of the British Empire
Archibald Prize finalists
20th-century New Zealand women artists